"Who’s Still Crazy" is a Kevin Ayers Spanish single release taken from his 1983 album, Diamond Jack and the Queen of Pain. It is backed with his autobiographical ‘Champagne and Valium’, also lifted from the same LP.

Track listing

"Who's Still Crazy" (Kevin Ayers)
"Champagne and Valium" (Kevin Ayers)

Personnel
Kevin Ayers / Guitar, Vocals
Ollie Halsall / Guitar, Vocals 
Zanna Gregmar
Carlos Garcia Vaso
Joaquin Montoya
Manolo Aguilar
Javier de Juan

Kevin Ayers songs
1983 singles
Songs written by Kevin Ayers
1983 songs
Warner Music Group singles